The following are people who were either born/raised or have lived for a significant period of time in Bács-Kiskun.

The arts

Art
 Ede Telcs sculptor

Film
 Kálmán Latabár actor, comedian

Literature

 József Katona author
 Ferenc Móra novelist
 Sándor Petőfi Hungarian national poet
 Kálmán Tóth poet

Music

 Zoltán Kodály composer, ethnomusicologist, educator, linguist and philosopher
 Emma Sándor composer, wife of Zoltán Kodály

Theater
 László Kelemen president of the first Hungarian Theater

Aviation and space exploration
 Béla Magyari cosmonaut

Business

Exploration

Military

 András Gáspár Hungarian general
 Lázár Mészáros Hungary's first Minister of War
 István Türr Giuseppe Garibaldi's general

Public office

 László Berkecz mayor of Soltvadkert
 Sándor Font  member of the National Assembly

Science and medicine

 József Bayer member of Hungarian Academy of Sciences
 Jenő Ernst doctor, biologist, member of Hungarian Academy of Sciences
 Dénes Jánossy mailing member of Hungarian Academy of Sciences
 Dezső Miskolczy explorer of the mental disease, member of Hungarian Academy of Sciences

Sports

See also

 List of Hungarians

Bacs-Kiskun County

Bács-Kiskun County